Haji Makame Faki is a Tanzanian CUF politician and Member of Parliament for Mtoni constituency since 2010.

References

Living people
Civic United Front MPs
Tanzanian MPs 2010–2015
Year of birth missing (living people)
Zanzibari politicians